Garabato  may refer to:
 Garabato (band), a Puerto Rican rock music band
 Uncaria guianensis, a plant species found in Guyana